The Revolutionary Marxist Party of India (RMPI) is a left-wing communist political party in India.

The party is based on the Marxist ideology, but has small parts of Marxist-Leninism. The party is formed as the merger of Kerala-based Revolutionary Marxist Party along with other parties that had the same goals to what they wanted to achieve in India. Most of the parties that were merged were communist, or Marxist parties. The parties that merged in 2016 were CPM Punjab, CPM Haryana, Chandigarh Marxist Party, Himachal Marxist Party, Chhattisgarh Marxist Party, Tamil Nadu Marxist Party, Andhra Marxist Party, West Bengal Marxist Party, and Delhi Marxist Party. The leaders of RMPI are Mangat Ram Pasla and K.K. Rema. The first All India Conference of Revolutionary Marxist Party Of India (RMPI) held at Chandigarh from November 23 to 26, 2017. The headquarters for the party are located in Jalandhar.

References

External links
 

Communist parties in India
Political parties established in 2017
2017 establishments in India
Communist Party of India (Marxist) breakaway groups